The Royal Grenadiers was an infantry regiment of the Non-Permanent Active Militia of the Canadian Militia (now the Canadian Army). The regiment was unique in its history as it was only one of two regiments in the Canadian Army to be designated as a Grenadier Regiment (the other unit being The Winnipeg Grenadiers). In 1936, the regiment was Amalgamated with The Toronto Regiment to form The Royal Regiment of Toronto Grenadiers (now The Royal Regiment of Canada).

Lineage

The Royal Grenadiers 

 Originated on 14 March 1862, in Toronto, Ontario, as The 10th Battalion Volunteer Militia Rifles, Canada.
 Redesignated on 21 November 1862, as The 10th Battalion Volunteer Militia (Infantry), Canada.
 Redesignated on 10 April 1863, as the 10th or "Royal Regiment of Toronto Volunteers"'.
 Redesignated on 5 August 1881, as the 10th Battalion, Royal Grenadiers.
 Redesignated on 8 May 1900, as the 10th Regiment, Royal Grenadiers.
 Redesignated on 1 May 1920, as The Royal Grenadiers.
 Amalgamated on 15 December 1936, with The Toronto Regiment and Redesignated as The Royal Regiment of Toronto Grenadiers (now The Royal Regiment of Canada).

Perpetuations 

 58th Battalion, CEF
 123rd Battalion (Royal Grenadiers), CEF

History

Early history 
On 14 March 1862, The 10th Battalion Volunteer Militia Rifles, Canada was authorized for service in Toronto, Canada West (now Ontario) with its Headquarters and line companies in Toronto. As in common with most Canadian Militia infantry regiments being raised at the time, they were as a rifle regiment. However around the same time of the regiments founding, the members of the unit requested to the militia department that they be organized and uniformed as a line infantry unit instead. As a result on 21 November 1862, the regiment was Redesignated as The 10th Battalion Volunteer Militia (Infantry) Canada and again on 10 April 1863, as the 10th or Royal Regiment of Toronto Volunteers.

The Fenian Raids 
The 10th or Royal Regiment of Toronto Volunteers was called out on active service from 8 to 31 March and from 1 to 22 June 1866. The battalion served on the Niagara frontier and would take part in the mopping up operations after the disastrous Battle of Ridgeway.

1880’s 
On 5 August 1881, the regiment was Redesignated as the 10th Battalion Royal Grenadiers. At the time, this unit would be the only other regiment of its type in the entire British Empire: the other regiment being The Grenadier Guards.

The North-West Rebellion 
On 27 March 1885, the 10th Battalion, Royal Grenadiers was called to arms and turned out in marching order the following day. The Battalion served with General Middleton's column of the North West Field Force, until they returned from active service on 24 July 1885. The 10th Royal Grenadiers would see action at the Battle of Fish Creek (24 April), and the Battle of Batoche (9-12 May), serving with distinction during the campaign and earning the regiment its first battle honours.

The South African War & Early 1900’s 
During the South African War, the 10th Battalion Royal Grenadiers contributed volunteers for the 2nd (Special Service) Battalion, The Royal Canadian Regiment of Infantry.

As a part of the country wide reorganisation of the Canadian Militia at the start of the 20th Century, on 8 May 1900, the regiment was Redesignated as the 10th Regiment, Royal Grenadiers.

The Great War 
On 6 August 1914, Details of the 10th Royal Grenadiers were placed on active service for local protection duties.

When the Canadian Expeditionary Force was raised, the 10th Royal Grenadiers contributed drafts to help raise the 3rd Battalion (Toronto Regiment), CEF alongside those from The Queen’s Own Rifles of Canada and The Governor General’s Body Guard.

On 20 April 1915, the 58th Battalion, CEF, was authorized for service and on 22 November 1915, the battalion embarked for Great Britain. After its arrival in Europe, on 22 February 1916, the 58th Battalion disembarked in France, where it fought as part of the 9th Canadian Brigade, 3rd Canadian Division in France and Flanders until the end of the war. On 15 September 1920, the 58th Battalion, CEF was disbanded.

On 22 December 1915, the 123rd Battalion (Royal Grenadiers), CEF was authorized for service and from 7 to 8 August 1916, the battalion embarked for Great Britain. On 17 January 1917, the battalion was converted to a Pioneer Battalion and Redesignated the 123rd Canadian Pioneer Battalion, Royal Grenadiers, CEF. On 10 March 1917, the battalion disembarked in France where it served as the Pioneer Battalion of the 3rd Canadian Division in France and Flanders. On 25 May 1918, the battalion was reorganized to form three new Engineering Battalions; the 7th, 8th and 9th Canadian Engineer Battalions, CEF. On 15 September 1920, the 123rd Battalion, CEF was disbanded.

1920s-1930s 
On 15 March 1920, as a result of the Otter Commission and the following post-war reorganization of the militia, the 10th Regiment Royal Grenadiers was Redesignated as The Royal Grenadiers and was reorganized with 2 battalions (1 of them a paper-only reserve battalion) to perpetuate the assigned war-raised battalions of the Canadian Expeditionary Force.

As a result of the 1936 Canadian Militia Reorganization, on 15 December 1936, The Royal Grenadiers was Amalgamated with The Toronto Regiment to form The Royal Regiment of Toronto Grenadiers (now The Royal Regiment of Canada).

Organization

The 10th Battalion Volunteer Militia Rifles, Canada (14 March 1862) 

 Regimental Headquarters (Toronto, Ontario)
 No. 1 Company (Toronto, Ontario)
 No. 2 Company (Toronto, Ontario)
 No. 3 Company (Toronto, Ontario)
 No. 4 Company (Toronto, Ontario)
 No. 5 Company (Toronto, Ontario)
 No. 6 Company (Toronto, Ontario)
 No. 7 Company (Toronto, Ontario)

10th Regiment Royal Grenadiers (5 June 1915) 

 Regimental Headquarters (Toronto, Ontario)
 A Company (Toronto, Ontario)
 B Company (Toronto, Ontario)
 C Company (Toronto, Ontario)
 D Company (Toronto, Ontario)

The Royal Grenadiers (21 February 1921) 

 1st Battalion (perpetuating the 58th Battalion, CEF)
 2nd (Reserve) Battalion (perpetuating the 123rd Battalion, CEF)

Alliances 

  - The Prince of Wales's Leinster Regiment (Royal Canadians) (Until 1922)

Uniform

Line Infantry 
When the 10th Regiment was first raised, it was first intended for it to be organized as a rifle regiment wearing the rifleman’s green uniform similar to that of The King’s Royal Rifle Corps, The Rifle Brigade or that of the 2nd Queen’s Own Rifles.

However, the new battalion was instead designated as a regiment of infantry. As such, the 10th Royals would wear the scarlet uniform of the line infantry. The uniform of the 10th Royals of a Scarlet Infantry Pattern tunic with dark (royal blue) blue facings and dark blue trousers with a red stripe. The officer’s uniform would also be of this similar pattern but from better quality materials. For an undress uniform, officers of the 10th Royals would wear a dark blue patrol jacket.

The regimental headdress consisted of the 1861 pattern "French" shako with a regimental plate on the front and a white-over-red ball tuft. The shako would later be replaced in 1879 by the blue home service helmet and later the white Canadian Pattern Service Helmet. The undress headdress for other ranks and NCO’s consisted of the dark-blue Kilmarnock cap with brass numerals indicating the regimental number. For the officers, they would instead wear a peaked forage cap.

Grenadiers 
When the battalion was redesignated as a regiment of Grenadiers in 1881, the 10th Grenadiers would adopt the full dress uniform similar to that of the Brigade of Guards in London and the Governor General’s Foot Guards in Ottawa. This uniform would consist of the grenadier pattern tunic with royal blue facings worn by the Foot Guards in London and the Governor General’s Foot Guards but with their regimental tunic having its buttons in singles similar to that of the Grenadier Guards (unlike the Governor General’s Foot Guards which have their buttons in pairs similar to that of the Coldstream Guards).

Though redesignated as Grenadiers in 1881, the regiment continued to wear the Canadian Pattern Service Helmet until the early 1890s when they finally changed to the grenadier bearskin cap for full dress. When it was adopted, it was worn with a white plume (later changed to a red-over white plume).

After The Royal Grenadiers were Amalgamated with The Toronto Regiment in 1936 and became The Royal Regiment of Canada, the grenadier pattern uniform became the regiment’s full dress uniform and is still used today by the regiment for ceremonial occasions.

Battle honours

North-West Rebellion 

 Fish Creek
 Batoche
 North West Canada, 1885

The South African War 

 South Africa, 1899–1900

The Great War 
 Ypres, 1915, '17
 Festubert, 1915
 Mount Sorrel
 Somme, 1916, '18
 Flers-Courcelette
 Ancre Heights
 Arras, 1917
 Vimy, 1917
 Arleux
 Scarpe, 1917, '18
 Hill 70
 Passchendaele
 Amiens
 Drocourt-Quéant
 Hindenburg Line
 Canal du Nord
 Cambrai, 1918
 Pursuit to Mons
 France and Flanders, 1915–18

Notable members 

 Brigadier General James Mason
 Lieutenant-Colonel H. J. Grasett

References 

Grenadier regiments of Canada
Military units and formations of Ontario
Royal Regiment of Canada
Canadian Militia units of The North-West Rebellion
Military units and formations disestablished in 1936